The Atelier de Construction de Puteaux (APX) (English translation: "Puteaux Construction Workshops") was a state arsenal belonging to the French Army.  It was located at 8, quai national in Puteaux.

History 
Atelier de Construction de Puteaux was in charge of making ammunition and carrying out tests. The factories also produced small and medium-sized equipment (firearms and knives), while the so-called “manufacturing” workshops produced larger equipment (artillery pieces).

Atelier de Construction de Puteaux disappeared after the Second World War, being transferred to Satory and merged with Ateliers de construction d'Issy-les-Moulineaux (AMX), which specialized in the construction of tanks and other armored vehicles.

Atelier de Construction de Puteaux had two responsibilities:

To design new weapons for the French Army. It specialized in small arms and medium caliber weapons and their accessories: such as machine guns, cannon, tank turrets, Telescopic sights for rifles, missiles etc.

And for serial production of those weapons, alone or concurrently with other factories.

Atelier de Construction de Puteaux achievements

Arms 
 1888 : prototype of Berthier rifle.
 1905 : Puteaux modèle 1905 machine gun. Only a few hundred copies were made because of its many defects. It was simplified and mass produced by the Manufacture d'armes de Saint-Étienne (MAS) as the St. Étienne Mle 1907 and used in the two world wars.
 1915 : prototype of the Fusil Mitrailleur Modele 1915 CSRG, better known as "Chauchat".
 1918 : 37 mm semi-automatic cannon  model 1918 (37 mm SA 18) for light tanks. 
 1935 : 25 mm APX modèle 1937, shortened version of the light 25 mm Hotchkiss anti-tank gun.
 1938 : 75mm high-velocity APX gun for the ARL V 39, modified from the 75mm 1929 casemate fortress gun.
 1969 : Rapid anti-tank weapon (ACRA).

Weapon accessories 
 1957 : firing scope of the MAS-49 rifle.

Tank turret 
 1934 : APX 3B turret fitted on the Panhard 178.
 1935 : APX 5 turret mounted on the AMR 35 ZT 2 and Gendron-Somua AMR 39.
 1936 : APX standard turret fitted on the prototype of the Hotchkiss H35, prototype of the Renault R35 and the FCM 36. 
 1938 : APX-R turret fitted on the H39 variant of the Hotchkiss H35, the Renault R35 and the Renault R40. A APX-R tank turret was planned to be mounted on the AMX 38.

References 

Motor vehicle assembly plants in France
Weapons manufacturing companies
Defence companies of France
Manufacturing companies based in Paris